There were nine total elections to the United States House of Representatives in 1911 during the 62nd United States Congress. Two of them were to fill the seats for the new states of Arizona and New Mexico, and the other seven were special elections to fill vacancies.

Special elections 

|-
! 
| Joel Cook
| 
| 1907 
|  | Incumbent died December 15, 1910.New member elected May 23, 1911.Republican hold.
| nowrap | 

|-
! 
| Walter I. Smith
| 
| 1900 
|  | Incumbent resigned March 15, 1911 to become judge of the U.S. Court of Appeals for the Eighth Circuit.New member elected June 5, 1911.Republican hold.
| nowrap | 

|-
! 
| Alexander C. Mitchell
| 
| 1910
|  | Incumbent died July 7, 1911.New member elected November 7, 1911.Democratic gain. 
| nowrap | 

|-
! 
| James P. Latta
| 
| 1908
|  | Incumbent died September 11, 1911.New member elected November 7, 1911.Democratic hold. 
| nowrap | 

|-
! 
| Henry C. Loudenslager
| 
| 1892
|  | Incumbent died August 12, 1911.New member elected November 7, 1911.Republican hold. 
| nowrap | 

|-
! 
| George W. Kipp
| 
| 1910
|  | Incumbent died July 24, 1911.New member elected November 7, 1911.Republican gain. 
| nowrap | 

|-
! 
| George Gordon
| 
| 1906
|  | Incumbent died August 9, 1911.New member elected November 7, 1911.Democratic hold. 
| nowrap | 

|}

Arizona 

|-
! 
| colspan=3 | None 
|  | New seat.New member elected December 12, 1911.Democratic gain.
| nowrap | 

|}

New Mexico 

|-
! rowspan=2 | 
| colspan=3 | None 
|  | New seat.New member elected November 7, 1911.Democratic gain.
| rowspan=2 nowrap | 
|-
| colspan=3 | None 
|  | New seat.New member elected November 7, 1911.Republican gain.

|}

References 

 
1911